Nedging Tye is a hamlet on the B1078 road, in the civil parish of Nedging-with-Naughton, in the Babergh district, in the county of Suffolk, England. The nearest town is Hadleigh. There is also the village of Naughton nearby.

Nedging-with-Naughton parish make-up 
Naughton
Nedging
Nedging Tye

References 
 Philip's Street Atlas Suffolk, 2007 edition. p. 80.

Hamlets in Suffolk
Babergh District